The Take were a Welsh punk rock/post-hardcore band from Cardiff, Wales. The Take have released two albums: Propeller (2002) on Household Name, and Dolomite (2006) on Bombed Out Records.

References

Welsh punk rock groups
Musical groups from Cardiff